The 1955 Dutch TT was the sixth round of the 1955 Grand Prix motorcycle racing season. It took place on 16 July 1955 at the Circuit van Drenthe, Assen.

A new 4.7 mile (7.7 km) circuit had been built at Assen for the Dutch TT; the public road version was no longer used after 1954. This track set the foundation for future Dutch TT's.

500 cc classification

350 cc classification

250 cc classification

125 cc classification

Sidecar classification

References

Dutch TT
Dutch
Tourist Trophy